is a Japanese professional sumo wrestler from Hirado. He wrestles for the Sakaigawa stable. His highest rank is maegashira 10.

Career

Early career
Sakaguchi Yūki comes from the city of Hirado, in the Nagasaki Prefecture. As a kid he participated in the Wanpaku National Sumo Championships for three consecutive years. In high school, he participated to the National Junior High School Sumo Championship. During this tournament, he stayed at the Sakaigawa stable to be lodged and trained there. In 2016, after graduating from junior high school, he decided to join professional sumo and entered the Sakaigawa stable because its head coach (former komusubi Ryōgoku) is also from Nagasaki. During his shin-deshi presentation, he shared the ring with Asanoyama and Yutakayama. In 2017, he changed his shikona to Hiradoumi to pay homage to his hometown.In 2021, it was announced that he will be promoted to sumo's second highest division (jūryō) for the November tournament. He is the first wrestler within his stable to reach sekitoriship since  , who reached the jūryō division in 2010. Following a strong performance in the July 2022 tournament, he was promoted to the makuuchi division. It was the first time in eleven years that a wrestler from Nagasaki prefecture was promoted to the top division. The last wrestler was Sadanofuji, Hiradoumi's coach at Sakaigawa stable, who made his makuuchi debut at the Kyūshū tournament in 2011.

Makuuchi career
Hiradoumi entered the top division during the September 2022 tournament, at the rank of maegashira 16. However, he suffered a narrow loss in his first tournament, achieving a 7-8 make-kochi record. In the following tournament of November, he managed to maintain his makuuchi rank due to the balance of promotion and demotion of other wrestlers. Even with a losing record, his performance received praises, notably from former yokozuna Kitanofuji, who praised his energy and his "unrivaled training enthusiasm". In the last tournament of 2022, he managed his first kachi-koshi in the top division by the twelfth day. He was listed as a potential Fighting spirit prize recipient but was shelved because he did not reach the majority of the attending committee members votes. In the first banzuke of 2023 Hiradoumi was ranked maegashira 10. He secured kachi-koshi at the January tournament on day 14 with a win over Kotoekō.

Career record

See also
Glossary of sumo terms
List of active sumo wrestlers

References

External links 

2000 births
Living people
Japanese sumo wrestlers